Michael Margotta (born September 1, 1946) is an American actor.

Career
Margotta appeared in the film that was Jack Nicholson's directorial debut, Drive, He Said (1971). In the year of its release, the film caused a stir because of Margotta appearing fully nude in a mental breakdown scene. Censors at the time attempted to give the film an X rating.

On television, Margotta appeared in the 1968 I Dream of Jeannie episode "The Guru" as a strung-out hippie named Harold.

Margotta was nominated for an Emmy for his appearance on Kojak in 1976. In the same year, he acted in the Canadian thriller film Partners.

Filmography

Film

Television

References

External links
 
 Profile, Fandango.com 
 Official site

1946 births
Living people
American male film actors
American male television actors
People from Rockland County, New York
Male actors from New York (state)